Since the mid-1990s, a 27 kilometre bus rapid transit network has been developed in Brisbane, Australia. It comprises grade-separated bus-only corridors, complementing the Queensland Rail City network. Management of the busway network is the responsibility of TransLink as coordinator of South East Queensland's integrated public transport system.

The Brisbane busway network currently consists of the South East Busway, Northern Busway and the Eastern Busway and carried over 70 million passengers in 2011.

Facilities

Stations on the Brisbane busway network comprise two semi glass-enclosed platforms, labelled platform 1 for services inbound to the Brisbane central business district and platform 2 for services outbound from the city, with the exception of Boggo Road busway station which are numbered 5 and 6 respectively to align with the parallel train platforms at Park Road railway station.

Bus departure information is displayed at each station, with fixed LED signs suspended above each platform. These signs present four lines of scheduled bus departure times, with data provided by Brisbane City Council's RAPID system. Busway stations contain full disabled accessibility, passenger seating, 24-hour CCTV cameras and emergency help point buttons. Bicycle access and storage is provided at most stations, as are go card fare machines. Public art may be found in some busway stations, tunnels and walls.

By 2016, the city had three busways, spanning 29 kilometres, including 27 stations and 20 tunnels.

Capacity
In peak hour, 294 buses per hour (one way) (1 every 12 seconds) passed the busway network's busiest point (a section of the South East Busway north of Woolloongabba station) in 2007, a number estimated to be approaching the busway's absolute maximum vehicle capacity using the current bus fleet. Given the maximum capacity of a majority of Transport for Brisbane buses is 62, any point along the busway network has a maximum theoretical passenger capacity of approximately 18,228 passengers per hour, since the entire network is built to the same specifications as the Woolloongabba stretch.

Planning history

The South East Queensland Integrated Regional Transport Plan 1997 recommended a 75 km, 65-station network of busways to be constructed in Brisbane in order to provide a rapid public transport system to areas not served by the existing Queensland Rail City network. A busway system was recommended over an expansion of the Queensland Rail network given the existing strong role of buses in the regional transport system and its cost effectiveness compared with constructing rail lines. It was envisaged that feeder buses would serve both busway and rail stations, allowing buses to service low-density communities while bypassing peak hour traffic congestion by using the busways where appropriate.

This recommendation built upon the Brisbane City Council's earlier Brisbane Busway Plan which was broadened into the SEQ Regional Busway Network plan. A network of five busways was planned which, inter alia, would improve the operation of the bus fleet while reducing maintenance and running costs.

Construction history

In August 1996, the Queensland Government approved the South East Transit Project which began planning and constructing the South East Busway between the Brisbane central business district and Eight Mile Plains. The first section of the busway, between the CBD and Woolloongabba, opened in September 2000 to coincide with the first match of the Olympic Games Football Tournament at the Gabba. The second section between Woolloongabba and Eight Mile Plains opened on 30 April 2001 at a final cost of over $600 million.

Planning for the construction of the Northern Busway began soon after the success of the South East Busway was demonstrated by increasing bus commuter statistics. The first section, from Roma Street in the CBD to Herston, was opened in February 2004 at a cost of $135 million. The second section, originally named the Inner Northern Busway, was opened in May 2008 at a cost of $333 million and linked the Northern Busway to the South East Busway through tunnels under the Brisbane CBD and a new station underneath King George Square. A further extension from Herston to Windsor, costing $198 million opened in June 2009. In June 2012, construction of a further extension from Windsor to Kedron opened, costing $444 million.

In 2007 construction began on the first stage of the Eastern Busway. The first stage was completed in August 2009, costing $366 million and involving the construction of the Eleanor Schonell Bridge and Australia's longest busway tunnel underneath the old Boggo Road Gaol. A 1 km extension of the Eastern Busway from Buranda to Main Avenue, Coorparoo commenced in August 2009 and was completed in August 2011 at a cost of $466 million.

Future construction

Plans exist to extend the Northern Busway from Kedron to Bracken Ridge and the Eastern Busway from Main Avenue, Coorparoo to Capalaba via Old Cleveland Road.

In 2011, the Brisbane City Council conducted a $2 million, 18-month feasibility study into constructing a bus-only bridge from the Cultural Centre busway station, linking to a busway tunnel travelling underneath the CBD and ending in Fortitude Valley. This was to relieve bus congestion on the CBD streets and the Victoria Bridge (caused by traffic lights operating at both ends of the bridge, seriously inhibiting the clearance of buses from the Cultural Centre busway station in peak hour.

Significance and criticism
Brisbane's network of busways is significant because it is the largest scale adoption of busways as a form of rapid public transport in Australia. Patronage numbers have grown over the busways' 12-year existence from carrying 0 to 70 million passengers annually, reducing the growth in traffic congestion and air pollution and minimising the need for new vehicular routes into the city along the busway corridors.

Brisbane's busways were designed to allow buses to service low-density suburbs and bypass peak hour congestion on major roads, linking with the rail network to improve public transport connectivity. This allows a balance between the convenience of localised bus services with the efficiency of medium haul commuter transport to the city's activity centres in a highly radial city like Brisbane.

However, it can be argued that a system designed like this increases the likelihood of dead running and underuse of available capacity. Dead running occurs on any highly peak-oriented radial bus or rail system where additional peak direction buses are added into the schedule or operated as "rocket" express routes. After or before their run in the peak direction the buses generally run empty, whether to head out for another run, back to the depot or to be positioned prior to starting another run (such as, in the afternoon peak). On the busways many of these dead running vehicles are perceived to be underused and to contribute to congestion. The counterargument to this is that this issue is related more to the dominance of the CBD as the largest employment centre within the region and that to change this requires a shift to forced interchanging for many people, likely reducing the attractiveness of the service. It is also true that these routes generally, but not always, bypass the most congested sections of the busway network by using alternative approaches to the city such as the Captain Cook Bridge or Water Street. The perceived under-use of available capacity is where less than full services travel on the busway. It is argued that this is caused by low patronage on the off-busway portion of many suburban routes. This has been argued to lead to busway route duplication where these services then enter a busway corridor and continue on into the inner city without being full, and to increased busway vehicular congestion and unnecessary air pollution created from vehicle emissions without a correspondingly high number of passengers. The counterargument to this is that by running these buses on the busway they provide additional available capacity to the often overcrowded spine services and that that forced interchange onto overcrowded spine services would reduce the attractiveness of bus as an travel option.

The decision not to connect the Legacy Way tunnel to the Northern Busway to provide for shorter travel times from the western suburbs to the city (via the Inner City Bypass) was also criticised as short-sighted given the lack of planned busway construction to those suburbs.

Services
Transport for Brisbane operate services across the entire network, while Clarks Logan City Bus Service operate services along the full length of the South East Busway (apart from Queen Street Mall bus station and Woolloongabba busway station) and Mt Gravatt Bus Service and Transdev Queensland services use the southern part of the South East Busway.

See also

 Brisbane Metro
 Bus transport in Queensland
 Transport in Brisbane

References

External links

Bus rapid transit in Australia
Bus transport in Queensland
Busways
Public transport in Brisbane